Enrico Bocchieri of AT&T Research in Florham Park, New Jersey is a computer engineer. He was named a Fellow of the Institute of Electrical and Electronics Engineers (IEEE) in 2013 for his contributions to computational models for speech recognition.

References

Fellow Members of the IEEE
Living people
Year of birth missing (living people)
Place of birth missing (living people)
American electrical engineers